Breznička is a village and municipality in Stropkov District in the Prešov Region of north-eastern Slovakia.

History
In historical records the village was first mentioned in 1430.

Geography
The municipality lies at an altitude of 220 metres and covers an area of 5.838 km2. It has a population of about 130 people.

Ethnicity
According to the 2001 Census, 96.3% were Slovak and 3.7% Rusyn.

Religion
According to the 2001 Census, 93.3% were Greek Catholic, 4.5% Orthodox and 2.2% Roman Catholic.

Genealogical resources

The records for genealogical research are available at the state archive "Statny Archiv in Presov, Slovakia"

See also
 List of municipalities and towns in Slovakia

References

External links
 
 
https://web.archive.org/web/20070513023228/http://www.statistics.sk/mosmis/eng/run.html
Surnames of living people in Breznicka

Villages and municipalities in Stropkov District
Zemplín (region)